Sikander Lalani is a businessman, MD at Roofings Group entrepreneur, industrialist, and former histopathologist in Uganda. He is reported to be one of the wealthiest individuals in Uganda.

Background and education
He was born on 4 November 1944 at Nsambya Hospital in Kampala. He trained as a histopathologist and practiced for two years in the 1960s at the University College Hospital in London, United Kingdom.

Career
He left medicine and opened a retail electronics store in Kigali, Rwanda, in the 1970s, specializing in the Philips brand. Later, he became a distributor of Goodyear tyres in Rwanda.

In 1976, his Japanese associates, who supplied him with electronics, introduced him to the idea of manufacturing metallic roofing materials in Rwanda. With the assistance of the Rwanda Development Bank, he successfully applied for a loan of US$1 million from the World Bank. In 1978, he set up a factory in Kigali, manufacturing roofing material. When genocide broke out in 1994, he left Rwanda for Tanzania. He then relocated to Uganda because of excessive bureaucracy in Tanzania.

Roofings Group

Over the last two decades, Lalani has built a steel-manufacturing conglomerate in Uganda, consisting of three separate factories. His businesses are organized into the Roofings Group.

Net worth
According to the New Vision newspaper in 2012, Lalani had a net worth of approximately US$100 million.

Personal
Lalani is married to Winnie Abotile Lalani. He is the father of eight children.

See also
List of wealthiest people in Uganda
Indian diaspora in East Africa

References

External links
 Webpage of Roofi Groups

Living people
1944 births
Ugandan pathologists
Ugandan businesspeople
Ugandan people of Indian descent